Florian Wohlers (born 1976) is a former German male canoeist who won 14 medals at individual senior level at the Wildwater Canoeing World Championships and European Wildwater Championships.

References

1976 births
Living people
German male canoeists
Sportspeople from Hamburg